The Masonic Temple in Lexington, Mississippi, is a historic building that was designated a Mississippi Landmark in 2003.

A three-story brick commercial building, the first story is leased for commercial use and the second for offices.  The third story was originally used as a meeting hall for Lexington Lodge No. 24, but the lodge now meets in a different location.

References

Former Masonic buildings in Mississippi
Buildings and structures in Holmes County, Mississippi
Mississippi Landmarks